During the 1995–96 English football season, Aston Villa competed in the Premier League. Villa made huge progress in their first full season under Brian Little's management. He had arrived at Villa Park in November 1994, taking charge of a side faced with a real threat of relegation just 18 months after almost winning the Premier League title. The rebuilding process had started almost immediately, with Little quickly discarding the likes of Kevin Richardson, Garry Parker, Earl Barrett and Ray Houghton, and bringing in Ian Taylor, Gary Charles, Alan Wright and Tommy Johnson as mid-season signings. The rebuilding process had continued over the summer of 1995, with Shaun Teale, Dalian Atkinson and even top scorer Dean Saunders heading out of the Villa Park exit door, in favour of new signings including Gareth Southgate and Serbian striker Savo Milosevic - who both broke the club's transfer record in quick succession.  

Villa finished fourth in the league and matched Liverpool's record of five League Cup victories (Liverpool have since reclaimed the record with victories in 2001, 2003 and 2012) thanks to a 3–0 Wembley win over Leeds United in March. Villa were also FA Cup semi-finalists, but their hopes of a Wembley double were ended with a defeat to Liverpool.

A new-look Villa side proved itself to be one of the finest in the country thanks to the likes of Gary Charles, Alan Wright, Ian Taylor and Mark Draper. Trinidadian striker Dwight Yorke proved himself as one of the Premier League's most competent goalscorers, though there were some doubts regarding the suitability of Savo Milošević as the man to replace Dean Saunders.

The club's longest-serving player, veteran goalkeeper Nigel Spink, left Villa halfway through the season after nearly 20 years to sign for local rivals West Bromwich Albion in Division One.

After the season ended, Little paid a club record £4million for Serbian midfielder Sasa Curcic. With Gary Charles facing a long stretch on the sidelines with a serious ankle injury picked up during the final weeks of the season, Little signed Portuguese right-back Fernando Nelson.

Final league table

Results summary

Results by matchday

Results
Aston Villa's score comes first

Legend

FA Premier League

FA Cup

League Cup

Players

First-team squad
Squad at end of season

Left club during season

Reserve squad
The following players made most of their appearances this season for the reserves, and did not appear for the first-team, or only appeared for the first-team in friendlies.

Youth squad
The following players spent most of the season playing for the youth team, and did not appear for the first team, but may have appeared for the reserve team.

Schoolboys
The following players were signed to Aston Villa as associated schoolboys, and did not appear for the youth or reserve teams this season.

Other players
The following players were signed to Aston Villa on unknown contractual terms, and did not appear for the youth or reserve teams this season.

Transfers

In

Out

Transfers in:  £9,250,000
Transfers out:  £3,020,000
Total spending:  £6,230,000

Statistics

Appearances and goals

|-
! colspan=14 style=background:#dcdcdc; text-align:center| Goalkeepers

|-
! colspan=14 style=background:#dcdcdc; text-align:center| Defenders

|-
! colspan=14 style=background:#dcdcdc; text-align:center| Midfielders

|-
! colspan=14 style=background:#dcdcdc; text-align:center| Forwards

|-
! colspan=14 style=background:#dcdcdc; text-align:center| Players transferred out during the season

Starting 11
Considering starts in all competitions

References

Notes

External links
Aston Villa official website
avfchistory.co.uk 1995–96 season

Aston Villa F.C. seasons
Aston Villa